Freddie Mwila Jr. (1 October 1974 – 23 March 2009) was a Zambian international footballer.

Career
Mwila spent most of his career playing for local side Nkana F.C. He also played professional football in Egypt with Zamalek.

Mwila made several appearances for the Zambia national football team, captaining the side during 2002 FIFA World Cup qualifying.

Personal
In March 2009, Mwila died shortly after complaining of a headache in Cairo, Egypt.

Mwila's father, Freddie Mwila, was a Zambian international football player and manager.

References

External links

1974 births
2009 deaths
Zambian footballers
Zambia international footballers
Association football forwards